List of military divisions – List of Finnish divisions in the Continuation War

This is a list of Finnish divisions that existed during the Continuation War, 1941–1944.
 1st Division
 2nd Division
 3rd Division
 4th Division
 5th Division
 6th Division – formed the 12th Brigade in 1942, reformed as 6th Division in 1943
 7th Division
 8th Division
 10th Division
 11th Division
 12th Division – formed 3rd Brigade in 1941
 14th Division
 15th Division
 17th Division
 18th Division
 19th Division – disbanded in 1942
 Armoured Division – formed in 1942
 Division J – formed in August 1941, disbanded in August 1942
 1st Coast Division – a Naval Forces unit, formed in July 1944''

See also 
 Finnish Army
 List of Finnish corps in the Continuation War
 List of Finnish corps in the Winter War
 List of Finnish divisions in the Winter War

References
 
 

Continuation War
Lists of military units and formations of World War II
Continuation War
Divisions, Continuation War
Divisions, Continuation War
Finland, Continuation War